The Karl Schwarzschild Medal, named after the astrophysicist Karl Schwarzschild, is an award presented by the Astronomische Gesellschaft (German Astronomical Society) to eminent astronomers and astrophysicists.

Recipients
Source: German Astronomical Society

See also

 List of astronomy awards

References

Astronomy prizes
German awards
Awards established in 1959